Federation of Jewish Communities may refer to
Federation of Jewish Communities of Russia
Federation of Jewish Communities of the CIS
 (Swiss Federation of Jewish Communities)
Federation of the Jewish Communities in Romania
, umbrella organization of Czech Jews